Sir Michael Alexander Soole (born 18 July 1954) is a British High Court judge.

Soole was educated at Berkhamsted School and took an MA from University College, Oxford. While at Oxford, he was president of the Oxford Union in 1974.

He was called to the bar at Inner Temple in 1977. In 1983 and 1987, he stood as the SDP candidate in Aylesbury, coming second both times.

He served as a recorder from 2000 to 2015 and took silk in 2002.

On 26 November 2015, he was appointed a judge of the High Court and assigned to the Queen's Bench Division. He took the customary knighthood in 2015. From January 2022, he serves as judge in charge of the Queen Bench's civil list.

In 2002, he married Catherine Gavine Marshall, with whom he has three step sons and two step daughters.

References 

Living people
1954 births
21st-century English judges
Queen's Bench Division judges
Alumni of University College, Oxford
Members of the Inner Temple
People educated at Berkhamsted School
Social Democratic Party (UK) parliamentary candidates
English King's Counsel
21st-century King's Counsel
Knights Bachelor